Ficus dendrocida is a species of plant in the family Moraceae. It is found in Brazil, Colombia, Panama, Venezuela, and eastern Bolivia. In Bolivia, it is one of a few closely related trees in the genus Ficus that are popularly known as bibosi.

References

dendrocida
Least concern plants
Taxonomy articles created by Polbot